Víctor Manuel Velásquez Molina (born April 12, 1976) is a retired Salvadoran football player.

Club career
Velásquez started his career at Dragón in 1996 and left them after five years for Salvadoran giants FAS with whom he won five league titles. After another five years he moved to Alianza, only to join Águila in 2008. He then had a one-year spell with Municipal Limeño and rejoined FAS for a final season before retiring.

International career
Velásquez made his debut for El Salvador in a May 1999 friendly match against Colombia and has earned a total of 54 caps, scoring 4 goals. He has represented his country in 10 FIFA World Cup qualification matches and played at the 2001, 2003, 2005 and 2007 UNCAF Nations Cups as well as at the 2002 and 2003 CONCACAF Gold Cups.

His final international game was a February 2007 UNCAF Nations Cup match against Guatemala.

International goals
Scores and results list El Salvador's goal tally first.

References

External links
 
 Profile - CD FAS 
 En la cancha de... Víctor Velásquez (Interview) - El SalvadorFC.com 

1976 births
Living people
People from La Unión Department
Association football central defenders
Salvadoran footballers
El Salvador international footballers
2001 UNCAF Nations Cup players
2002 CONCACAF Gold Cup players
2003 UNCAF Nations Cup players
2003 CONCACAF Gold Cup players
2005 UNCAF Nations Cup players
2007 UNCAF Nations Cup players
C.D. FAS footballers
Alianza F.C. footballers
C.D. Águila footballers